The Government of the Republic of Armenia or the executive branch of the Armenian government is an executive council of government ministers in Armenia. It is one of the three main governmental branches of Armenia and is headed by the Prime Minister of Armenia.

Current government 

The incumbent government of Armenia is led by Prime Minister Nikol Pashinyan who, as leader of Civil Contract (the party which won elections in December 2018), was appointed Prime Minister on 14 January 2019 by President Armen Sarkissian.

Powers

Powers of Government granted by former revision of Constitution (accepted in 2005)

Resignation of the Government and its formation
Following the Article 55 of Armenian Constitution, the Republic's President must accept resignation of the government on the day of 
 first sitting of newly elected Nation Assembly
 assumption of the office by the President of the Republic 
 expression of the vote of no confidence to the Government
 resignation of the Prime Minister
 vacant position of Prime Minister

Later on the Prime Minister must be appointed by the President of the Republic. The elected Prime Minister should enjoy the confidence of majority Deputies and if this is impossible the confidence of maximum number of the Deputies. Ministers must be appointed within 20 days after Prime Minister is appointed. After these the Government is considered to be formed. All the ministers, including the prime minister, must be citizens of the Republic of Armenia. The structure of the Government must be defined by law in regard to recommendation by the Government. The procedure for the organization of operations of the Government and other public administration bodies under the Government must be defined by the decree of the President upon the submission of Prime Minister.

The role of the Prime Minister is that it should supervise the Government activities, coordinate the work of the Ministers and it should adopt decisions on the organization of Government activities. In addition, decisions passed by the Government must be signed by the Prime Minister. The president has the right to suspend Governmental decisions for one month for checking the compliance of decisions with the constitution. Government decisions about appointment or dissolution of the governors must be approved by the President.

The president has a right to invite and head government sittings about issues of defence, foreign policy or national security.

The mission of Government
According to article 85 of the Armenian constitution, the Government shall develop and implement the domestic policy and it should implement foreign policy of the Republic of Armenia jointly with the President of the Republic of Armenia.

By virtue of the Constitution, the international treaties, the laws of the Republic of Armenia, or the decrees of the President of the Republic and to ensure the implementation thereof the Government shall adopt decisions, which shall be subject to observance in the whole territory of the Republic"

Responsibilities of the Government
As it is defined in the Article 89 of the Constitution of Armenia the Government shall:

1) submit its program to the National Assembly for approval in accordance with Article 74 of the Constitution;
2) submit the draft state budget to the National Assembly for approval, ensure the execution of the budget and submit financial reports on the budget execution to the National Assembly;
3) manage the state property;
4) implement unified state policies in the areas of finances, economy, taxation, loans and credits;
4.1) implement the state territorial development policy.
5) implement state policies in the areas of science, education, culture, health, social security and environmental protection;
6) ensure the implementation of the defense, national security and foreign policies of the Republic;
7) ensure maintenance of law and order, take measures to strengthen the legal order and ensure rights and freedoms of the citizens;
8) perform other functions and powers provided by the Constitution and laws.

Program and Budget of the Government

The Article 74 of the Constitution of Armenia states that the government must within twenty days of its formation present its developed program to the National Assembly of the Republic. Later on the National Assembly should discuss and vote for the approval of the program within five days after its presentation. The President shall dissolve the National Assembly if it does not give an approval to the program of the Government two times in succession within two months.

Regarding state budget, The Government shall submit the draft of the state budget to the National Assembly at least ninety days prior to the beginning of the fiscal year. The Government may put forward a motion of its confidence in conjunction with the adoption of the state budget. If the National Assembly does not express no confidence in the Government then the state budget as well as the amendments approved by the Government shall be considered adopted.

If the National Assembly expresses no confidence in the Government in conjunction to the draft of the state budget, the new Government shall submit the draft state budget to the National Assembly within a period of ten days after the approval of its program. This draft shall be debated and voted on by the National Assembly within a period of thirty days in accordance with the procedure defined by this Article.

Restriction on members of Government

According to Article 88 of Armenian Constitution "A member of Government can not be engaged in hold an office  in commercial organizations or in state and local self-government bodies not connected with his/her duties, or be involved in entrepreneurial activities, save for pedagogical creative, and academic activities."

Powers on local self-governed communities
Articles 109 and 110 of Armenian Constitution state that the Government may remove the Head of Community in cases prescribed by the law on the basis of the conclusion of the Constitutional Court. The communities may, based on the interests of the public, be merged with each other or separated by the law. The appropriate law shall be adopted by the National Assembly upon the recommendation of the Government. Before submitting the legislative initiative the Government shall appoint local referendums in those communities. The outcomes of the local referendums shall be attached to the legislative initiative. The communities may be merged or separated irrespective of the outcomes of the local referendums.

Regional governors
Based on Article 88.1, regional governors are appointed and dismissed by decisions of Government and they are validated by the President. The Regional Governors shall pursue the territorial policy of the Government, coordinate the activities of the territorial services of the executive bodies, save for cases prescribed by the law.

Powers regarding legislative initiatives

The Government has a right of legislative initiative.  It has the right to determine the sequence of the debate for its proposed draft legislation and can demand that they be voted only with amendments acceptable to it.

The Government may put forward a motion on confidence in the Government in conjunction with the adoption of a draft law proposed by the Government. If within twenty four hours after the Government has raised the question of the vote of confidence a minimum of one third of the total number of Deputies does not put forward a draft resolution on expressing no confidence in the Government or if no resolution on expressing no confidence in the Government is adopted by the majority of the total number of Deputies the draft law proposed by the Government shall be considered adopted. However, the Government can not put the motion on confidence more than two times in any single session.

Leaders 
Each of the three Armenian Republics had an executive branch at the time of their existence, each being led by a prime minister.

Prime Ministers of Armenia

Chairman of the Council of Ministers of the Armenian Soviet Socialist Republic
The governmental structure of the Armenian Soviet Socialist Republic was similar to that of the other Soviet republics. It is mentioned in the article 79 of U.S.S.R. constitution "The highest executive and administrative organ of state power of a Union Republic is the Council of People's Commissars of the Union Republic". The Council was formed by Supreme Soviet of the Union Republic, which was the only legislative body in a Union Republic and the highest organ of State Power. The Council consisted of the following positions:

Chairman
Vice-Chairman
Chairman of the State Planning Commission
People's Commissars-of:
Food industry, light industry, agriculture, finance, internal trade, justice, education, municipal economy, public health etc. 
The Representative of the Committee of Agricultural Stocks
Chief of the Board of Arts
The Representative of the All-Union People's Commissariats
 
The Council issued orders and decisions and supervised their execution. The Council was responsible and accountable to Supreme Soviet of the Union Republic but between the sessions of the Union Republics Supreme Soviet, the Council was responsible and accountable to the Presidium of the same Supreme Soviet.  The Council of People's Commissars controlled those branches of state administration that came within the jurisdiction of Union Republic. It issued within the limits of the jurisdiction of their respective People's Commissariats, orders and instructions. The Council of People's Commissariats of a Union Republic were either Union-Republic or Republican Commissariats. Union-Republican controlled those branches of the state administration that were entrusted to them and were subordinate both to the Council of People's Commissars of the Union Republic and to the appropriate Union-Republic People's Commissars of the U.S.S.R.. The Republican Commissariats again directed branches that were entrusted to them but were subordinate only to Council of People's Commissars of the Union Republic.

Prime Ministers of the First Armenian Republic
On May 30, 1918, Armenian Revolutionary Federation (ARF) decided that Armenia must be a republic under a provisional coalition government. It was decided that the Republic must have its own constitution and self-governing system. The government of the Republic was headed by Prime Minister. He was chosen by the National Council of Armenia. Later on the Prime Minister himself formed his cabinet. Prime minister was accountable for international, domestic and regional issues. The first Prime Minister became Hovhannes Katchaznouni whose cabinet was made up from five members, all of which were from ARF. In addition, a ministry of interior was created, whose first head was Aram Manukian. The ministry of interior was responsible for domestic problems. Its key responsibilities were to create public school system, railroad system, communication and telegraph systems, also it was responsible for enforcing law and order. All these responsibilities were controlled by a specific department, each of which became a separate ministry later on.

Prime Minister had direct involvement in regional and international issues. Hamazasp Ohanjyan, the third prime minister, and Avetis Aharonian left for Berlin trying to reassure the tense relations between Turkey and Armenia. Unfortunately none of them succeeded to accomplish his goal.

See also

National Assembly (Armenia)
Politics of Armenia
President of Armenia

References

 
European governments